There are various individual skills and team tactics that are required to play Australian rules football effectively. These are dictated by tradition and the sport's laws.

Individual skills and tactics

Ball handling and general athleticism
The most generic skill for a player is ball handling – being familiar with the shape and weight of the football, how to securely grip and hold it, and how to predict its movement on the ground and through the air.

Additionally, there is a strong emphasis on individual athleticism for players. Physical fitness is necessary because play sees few breaks, takes place across a field 150–180 metres long, and has few restrictions on player position on the ground.

Possession skills

Possession of the football is required to score so a core group of skills relate to possessing the football. These include:
 Marking – e.g. arm or chest mark, overhead mark
 Bouncing the ball – e.g. running bounce
 Pick up – e.g. collecting an unclaimed ball while it is loose on the ground

Disposal skills

In order to progress the football across the field of play in order to gain advantage or score the football must be disposed of legally by the controlling player. This can be done by:

 Kicking – e.g. drop punt, torpedo punt, snap, banana kick; or
 Handball

In specific situations where a pause in play has occurred (e.g. a stoppage or ball-up from the umpire), the ball may be contested in a specific way:

 Hitting out

Checking skills

While not in possession of the football, a player will still need to work to gain possession of the football, force an error from the opposing player, or to provide an  advantage to a team-mate.

 Smothering
 Tackling
 Bumping
 Spoiling 
 Kicking 
 Shepherding

One percenters
These skills get their name from the minor advantage they gain for a team.

 Spoil
 Drawing a free kick
 Intercept marks
 Smother

Styles of play

Player on Player

Player on Player (sometimes referred to as "man on man") is a traditional style of play which is used in juniors and grassroots to learn the game, but sometimes used professionally as a defensive structure or to disrupt play. It involves players starting in designated set positions and playing alongside their opponent for as long as possible. This style of play results in maximum contests and provides very few opportunities for tactics. Coaches sometimes utilise one or more players that specialise in sticking with their opponents to negate their play this is called "tagging" or "run-with" players.

Direct
Direct football, often referred to as playing up the guts, contested footy or corridor footy requires moving the ball on the shortest possible path from goal to goal, i.e. without going to the boundary of the field.

This puts the ball into areas crowded with players. Direct football can result in frequent physical contests, and forwards are not always able to mark the ball.  As a result, crumbers (small players at the fall of the ball) become more important are often instructed to run to pick up the loose ball

In direct football, the role of ruckmen and midfield centre clearances become critical.

Possession
Modern professional football has seen the advent of possession football, making the game similar to Association football.  In Australian football it is often referred to as playing keepings off.  The aim of possession football is to avoid kicking the ball to a player under pressure, denying the opposition of opportunities to take possession.

There are generally two ways that teams execute possession football in the modern game, marking and by handball.

Kicking
The rules governing catching a kicked ball allow for "possession football". A player who catches the ball (called taking a mark) gets a short time period where they can kick the ball without being tackled or interfered with. Teams will sometimes kick backwards to allow a teammate to take a mark. This prevents the team losing possession.  The AFL has experimented with rules in the NAB Cup to prevent this anti-competitive play.

Handball
Although the rules allowed for the handball most Australian rules leagues handball was largely a secondary skill to the kick. The handball has become a far more widely used skill in the contemporary game.

Tempo football
The term Tempo football was coined by commentators to describe the tactic of controlling the tempo of the game.  Australian rules is a game in which teams can score very quickly and gain a psychological advantage to overwhelm their opponents.  When a team looks like getting a run on, opposition sides sometimes play tempo football to deliberately slow down the game.   This may include forcing a bounce (either through scrimmages or forcing the ball out of bounds, flooding or through playing possession football and timewasting).  Once in possession, they may then speed up the game with direct or running football.  Commentators labelled the Sydney Swans 2005 premiership team masters at tempo football and they were also widely criticized for it.

Environmental Conditions and playing styles

Kicking with the wind
Kicking with the wind is one style of direct play in which the team would use strong winds to advantage. Teams place emphasis on the direction of play and determine defensive strategies and long kicking and run-on football to gain extra distance in attack. Captains that win the coin toss will often elect to kick into or against the wind. Strong winds can assist teams in the final quarter of each term when players are tiring. They can alternatively assist them in the first and third "premiership" quarters. They can also assist in scoring and provide better opportunities for a long distance after the siren attempts during close matches. In some grounds, the wind will swirl, which teams can use to advantage by compensating their kicks for the prevailing wind or tactically attacking or defending along a boundary the ground that the wind favours.

Wet Weather Footy
Wet weather football involves a different style of play in which teams may deliberately kick to contests as it results in the ball more often going to ground. Teams that play most in wet or cold climates, either light rain in temperate climates (such as Melbourne and Adelaide) and or heavy rain tropical/subtropical conditions (Brisbane, Darwin) often have an advantage of the slipperiness of the ball and ground. Coaches may instruct players to knock the ball on instead of take possession. Coaches may advise players not to kick or handball short as the ball may be more easily dropped, fumbled or the player tackled due to reduced foot speed. Wet weather often makes drop punts less effective and teams with torpedo punt specialists use it to cut through the conditions more easily and gain attacking distance. Coaches may advise players to drop into the square in defence as the heavy ball drops short of the goal line. Defensively coaches may advise to cause stoppages as often as possible to lock up the ball and to try to rush behinds or force the ball out of bounds if possible. Wet weather can also help attacking teams to more easily break tackles and run the ball into attack, however coaches will almost always advise run anc carry players to touch the ball on the ground rather than bounce in wet conditions. Coaches may advise players to make use of the wet ground to enable the ball to skid and gain extra distance. In the AFL, extreme wet conditions can prevent matches from proceeding, however grassroots matches have been played in rain, hail and snow. A lack of wet conditions can also either advantage or disadvantage professional teams based in covered stadiums such as the Docklands Stadium.

Set plays

Kick-in Tactics
After a behind has been scored, a designated kicker must return the ball to play from the goal square.
Kick-ins are one of the most strategic set plays in the game of Australian football.

7-point play
The term "7-point play" was coined by fans of the Glenelg Football Club in South Australia and was subsequently picked up by broadcast commentators to describe the situation where a team has been able to convert a missed goal (behind) into 7 points by stealing the ball directly from a kick-in and scoring a goal.

Zone
The zone defence at kick ins was popularised by Kevin Sheedy and brought from basketball.  The opposition forwards will disperse approximately 20 metres apart in the defensive 50-metre arc.

The main methods were used to penetrate the zone:

 Long kicking (such as the torpedo punt), typically with the target being a ruckman or other tall player
 Short kicking (typically to a fast running back pocket player), although this can be risky as it is closer to goal
 Fullback play-on – this requires the fullback to perform a solo move to leave the goalsquare and run on, gaining enough distance to break the zone

Cluster
The cluster involves players from the team kicking the ball in congregating at the top of the 50-metre arc and breaking in different directions.  The player kicking in will typically have a designated spot or target player to kick to.  The opposition team will often resort to a zone defence to successfully counter this tactic, and hence it is rarely used.

Bounces and throw-in Tactics

Bounces and throw-ins are critical set plays in Australian football, and the ruckmen and midfielders will often use these opportunities to execute specific set-play strategies.

Defensive tactics

Rushed behinds
A strategy for defenders was to deliberately concede a point (behind) to regain possession of the ball.  Some spectacular examples of this include Mal Michael's controversial "own goal" from 30 metres.  Under coach Alastair Clarkson, Hawthorn used this tactic in the 2008 AFL Grand Final, conceding 11 rushed behinds.  It caused the AFL to review the laws and award a free kick for deliberate rushed behinds.

Flooding

Flooding exploits the freedom of movement of players around the ground.  It involves the coach releasing players in the forward line from their set positions and directing them to the opposition forward area, congesting the area and making it more difficult for the opposition to score. It is commonly deployed to protect a lead, or prevent a rout. This is possible due to the lack of an offside rule or similar restrictions on players field movements. In 2000, it was infamously employed by the Western Bulldogs to end Essendon's 20-game winning streak.

Rolling zone
The rolling zone or cluster, pioneered by Hawthorn coach Alastair Clarkson executes the zone defence, but across the entire field.  Such a tactic requires extreme fitness and co-ordination of the entire team.

Teams can break the rolling zone by playing direct football, or kicking long to a contest.

Attacking tactics

Primary target
Before the 1980s, teams would often simply kick high to a full forward whose role was to kick goals.

Allan Jeans used Jason Dunstall as a lead up full forward and established a new breed of lead up full forward who would lead up the ground in a straight line, providing midfielders with a large, fast and strong running target to kick to.  This made it very difficult for opposition sides and lead up full forwards would provide game winning firepower. Such players included Tony Lockett, Gary Ablett and Tony Modra.

In response to the lead up full forward, opposition teams will often double team a full forward and stand "in the hole" (often tall ruckmen) to prevent them from leading into open space.

In response, coaches began recruiting specialist decoy forward or secondary target who were able to run in a different direction to the primary target and were accurate at set shots.

More recently, flooding and other defensive tactics have denied opportunities for using both the primary and secondary target tactics.

Forward play

Pagan's paddock
North Melbourne coach Denis Pagan pioneered a technique called Pagan's Paddock, which involves ordering all attacking players to clear the attacking 50 metres of players and bombing the ball into the open space.  This would give key forwards (in his case specifically Wayne Carey) room to run into, often running with the flight of the ball toward goal.
In recent times, a similar tactic for the Sydney Swans' Lance Franklin has been described as Buddy's box.

Rotating forwards
Rotating forwards is a tactic where coaches move and change forward players to exploit different match ups create space to lead diagonally when the ball is inside the 50 metre arc.

Forward pressure
Historically forwards were "stay at home" players, lacked endurance and would not run and chase.  This allowed defenders to run out and set up long attacking players.

This has changed significantly and modern forwards are expected to chase down and tackle defenders and in fact steal goals. Leigh Matthews' triple-premiership-winning Brisbane Lions (which had superstar players such as Jason Akermanis) excelled at applying forward pressure on opposition teams. These days, shorter, faster forwards such as Aaron Davey are becoming increasingly popular for applying forward pressure, and they are credited with revolutionising the attacking game.

Running in waves
Hawthorn's dominant 1980s team used the tactic of running in waves using multiple handballs to draw the man, move the ball down the field and open holes in the attack in a similar way to rugby.  In recent years, the tactic has been revitalised by the Geelong Football Club.

Intimidation and attrition tactics
An often overlooked tactic in Australian football is using attrition, violence and intimidation in an attempt to win matches.

Attrition
The aim is often to physically wear down the opposition or to deliberately "take out" a key player.  Historically this tactic is called "playing the man" (as opposed to playing the ball). The attrition tactic has been used to reduce teams to less than 18 fit players on the field, resulting in the offending side having the advantage of extra players.

The 1945 VFL Grand Final was dubbed "The Bloodbath" Grand Final due to the violence resulting in sixteen reportable offences.

During the 1980s, attrition tactics became a popular tactic.

The 1989 VFL Grand Final (informally dubbed "The Battle of '89") is probably the most famous of all matches of attrition football, with when two physically dominant and aggressive teams lined up against each other.  At the start of the match an attack occurred on Dermott Brereton with the intention of taking him out of the game. This  set the tone for a match in which several key players were hospitalised including Brownlow medalists John Platten and Robert Dipierdomenico (in an incident involving Geelong's Gary Ablett).

Unsociable football
While the rules are more strict in the modern game (in the AFL there are now strict fines for melees for example), some teams still engage in "unsociable football". Targeting the bodies of other players, "professional free kicks" would often be conceded and sometimes even suspension. Even playing strictly within the rules, tackles can be extremely vigorous and injury-causing and occasionally teams appear to have a tactic of directing the strongest tackles towards a particular opposition player.

In a match during the 2005 AFL season, an incident of unsociable football was accused of bringing the game into disrepute when an injured Nick Riewoldt was targeted by two Brisbane Lions players.  Riewoldt had broken his collar bone and whilst he grimaced in pain, he was subsequently aggressively bumped by the Brisbane's Chris Scott and Mal Michael before he left the ground.

Sledging and Taunting
Without an offside rule and due to large open spaces, players spend a lot of time on the field next to or running with their opponents (termed "manning up") often long distances from umpires. Players often attempt to put off kickers when standing the mark. This gives opportunities for the psychological intimidation tactic of "sledging", or verbal abuse or intimidating opponents with body language equivalent to bullying. While vilification codes for sledging have been introduced in recent years with large penalties including distance penalties for players standing the mark, this tactic has been widely used since the game's early days and can lead to teams responding and large melees ensuing as players defend their teammates en masse. Players like Mark Jackson "The Clown Prince" were known to employ a large repertoire of showman tactics to upset and put the opposition off their game.

References

External links
 AFL Community - 2015 Coaching Manuals
 AFL Community - Skills portal

Australian rules football terminology
Tactics And Skills